Onitsha is a novel by French Nobel laureate writer J. M. G. Le Clézio. It was originally published in French in 1991 and an English translation was released in 1997.

Plot summary
Onitsha tells the story of Fintan, a young European boy who travels from Bordeaux to the port of Marseilles to sail  along the coast of Africa to the mouth of the Niger River to Onitsha in colonial Nigeria with his Italian mother (nicknamed Maou) in the year 1948. Warren Motte wrote a review in World Literature Today to note that, like many of Le Clézio's writings  Onitsha is a novel of apprenticeship. He mentions that the very first words of the novel inscribe the theme of the journey and announce that it will occupy the foreground of the tale and he quotes a passage from Onitsha to exemplify Fintan's reluctance to embark upon that journey
It was a long journey as Le Clézio wrote:

They were intending to meet Geoffroy Allen (Fintan's English father  an oil company executive who is obsessed with uncovering the area's ancient history by tracking down myths and legends) whom Fintan has never met. Onitsha depicts childhood, because it is written semi-autobiographically, but seen through the eyes of  Fintan and to lesser extent his father, and his mother, who is not able to fit in with the colonial society of the town of Onitsha with its casual acceptance of 'native' slave labour.
Le Clézio wrote:

Eventually, Fintan's father loses his job with the United Africa Company and moves the family first to London, then to the south of France. Sabine Rhodes, another British National, already a miscast in the colony recognises the inevitable The novel ends on a note of rebellion against the white rulers and points towards the coming of the neocolonialism  of  conglomerates which would finally begin another form of economic exploitation of a country rich in oil.

Critique
The book is a critique on racism and the vestiges of colonialism as seen from the youthful perspective of the main character

Throughout the book, Fintan's rejection of colonialism is symbolized by the attacks of his mother Maou, who increasingly speaks out against the way the colonials treat the indigenous people. The book seemingly mimics Le Clézio's own life, especially when the character travels back to Africa in an attempt to fill in the sense of loss he had suffered, to renew it in his mind, a task that ends in a dead end.

Translating Onitsha
Alison Anderson is the author of Darwin's Wink and the translator of seventeen books, including The Elegance of the Hedgehog, by Muriel Barbery.  Anderson wrote about how it was for her to have translated Onitsha for the fall 1997 edition of World Literature Today

Alison Anderson published her own  synopsis of Onitsha

Publication history

First French Edition

First English translation

Second English translation

External links

Search

A "Google Book search" accesses the contents of the book as well as giving a list of places mentioned in the book and also accesses the reader to an excerpt of the English version of Onitsha (chapter one "A long Voyage").

References

1991 French novels
Novels by J. M. G. Le Clézio
French autobiographical novels
French bildungsromans
Novels set in the 1940s
Novels set in France
Novels set in colonial Africa
Works by J. M. G. Le Clézio
Éditions Gallimard books